Kevin Kim, who was the defending champion, lost to Greg Jones in the first round.
Robert Kendrick defeated qualifier Michael Shabaz in the final 6–2, 6–3 to win the tournament.

Seeds

Draw

Finals

Top half

Bottom half

References
 Main Draw
 Qualifying Draw

Virginia National Bank Men's Pro Championship - Singles
2010 Singles